The Eihusen Arena is a 7,500-seat multi-purpose arena in Grand Island, Nebraska, USA. Opened in 2006 as part of the Heartland Events Center at Fonner Park, it hosts local sporting events and concerts.  It was also home to the Indoor Football League's Nebraska Danger, which began play in 2011.

The arena also serves as a concert venue for the Nebraska State Fair.

External links 
Heartland Events Center - Eihusen Arena

Sports venues in Nebraska
Indoor arenas in Nebraska
Buildings and structures in Hall County, Nebraska
Tourist attractions in Hall County, Nebraska
Sports in the Tri-Cities, Nebraska